The Wooden Church (Deszkatemplom, lit. "wooden plank church") is a church in Miskolc, Hungary. It is built of carved wood. The present building was built in 1999 in place of the previous one that was destroyed by arson in 1997.

The first church was consecrated on September 13, 1637, but both this date and the existence of the church are preserved only in tradition and there is no documentary evidence. The first document mentioning a church at this site dates back to 1698. This church was built of wood, but nothing else is known about it. The first church known by the name of 'Wooden Church' was built in 1724 and it stood until 1937.

István Bató, a 19th-century citizen of Miskolc left a large sum to the church. As long as there are Protestants in Miskolc, this wooden church should be kept in good condition... should it burn down, it should be rebuilt of wood, he wrote in his will. Thus when the church became too old to maintain, the citizens decided that the new church should also be built of wood.

The new church was designed by Bálint Szeghalmi. It was made entirely of wood brought from Transylvania, an area with long traditions of wood-carving, and the design also had Transylvanian elements. (Szeghalmi also designed the first permanent lookout tower on Avas hill in similar style.) The result was a beautiful and unique church. The construction was finished by 1938.

The church was set on fire by an arsonist on December 4, 1997. The city mourned its loss, and an almost identical church was built in its place in 1999.

External links

 About the Wooden Church on the HelloMiskolc.hu

Churches completed in 1637
17th-century Calvinist and Reformed churches
Churches completed in 1724
Churches completed in 1999
20th-century Protestant churches
Churches in Miskolc
Rebuilt buildings and structures in Hungary
Wooden churches
Churches destroyed by arson
1637 establishments in Europe
Wooden buildings and structures in Hungary